The second season of the American comedy television series Silicon Valley premiered in the United States on HBO on April 12, 2015. The season contained 10 episodes, and concluded on June 14, 2015.

The season picks up immediately following Pied Piper's victory at TechCrunch Disrupt. Seeking a Series A investment, they are courted by Laurie Bream (Suzanne Cryer)—who replaced Peter Gregory at Raviga Capital after his death—among other venture capital firms. Hooli CEO Gavin Belson (Matt Ross) sues Pied Piper, alleging that Richard (Thomas Middleditch) created the algorithm on Hooli property during company time. Richard eventually decides to work with Russ Hanneman (Chris Diamantopoulos) instead.

Cast

Main 
Thomas Middleditch as Richard Hendricks
T.J. Miller as Erlich Bachman
Josh Brener as Nelson "Big Head" Bighetti
Martin Starr as Bertram Gilfoyle
Kumail Nanjiani as Dinesh Chugtai
Amanda Crew as Monica Hall
Zach Woods as Donald "Jared" Dunn
Matt Ross as Gavin Belson
Suzanne Cryer as Laurie Bream
Jimmy O. Yang as Jian-Yang

Recurring

Episodes

Production 
In April 2014, HBO renewed the series for a second season. In October 2014, it was reported that Rebecca Creskoff had been cast as a series regular as Laurie Bream; however, in January 2015, it was announced that the role had been recast with Suzanne Cryer. In November, it was reported that Chris Diamantopoulos had been cast in the recurring role of Russ Hanneman. Beginning with this season, Jimmy O. Yang and Matt Ross were promoted to series regulars after having recurring roles in the first season.

Reception

Critical response 
On review aggregator Rotten Tomatoes, the season holds a 96% approval rating, earning a "Certified Fresh" rating. It holds an average score of 8.51/10 based on 23 reviews. The site's critical consensus reads "Silicon Valley re-ups its comedy quotient with an episode that smooths out the rough edges left behind by the loss of a beloved cast member." Similarly, on Metacritic, which uses a weighted average, holds a score of 86 out of 100, based on 9 reviews, indicating "universal acclaim".

Jeff Jensen of Entertainment Weekly, who gave the season an A rating, described it as "smart and snide", saying that "the show's actors imbue their geeky cut-outs with winsomely flawed humanity that allows us to care about them even as they undercut each other and themselves in their pursuit of success and significance. Pied Piper may never reach greatness, but Silicon Valley seems ready to." For The Hollywood Reporter, Tim Goodman praised the season as "impressively upgraded after a stellar first season."

One focus for critics was the show's replacement for Christopher Evan Welch, who died during the production of season 1. In Vulture, Matt Zoller Seitz praised Welch's replacement, Suzanne Cryer, saying "both the character and the actress are excellent – at once reassuringly familiar and off-putting in ways that don't register right away." Less enthusiastic, Brian Tallerico on RogerEbert.com described Cryer's character Laurie Bream as a "fill-in character".

Accolades 
For the 73rd Golden Globe Awards, the series was nominated for Best Series (Musical or Comedy). The series also received seven nominations at the 67th Primetime Emmy Awards, including Outstanding Comedy Series, Outstanding Directing for a Comedy Series (Mike Judge for "Sand Hill Shuffle"), and Outstanding Writing for a Comedy Series (Alec Berg for "Two Days of the Condor"), Outstanding Production Design, Outstanding Single-Camera Picture Editing, and Outstanding Sound Mixing.

Home media
The second season was released on DVD and Blu-ray on April 19, 2016; bonus features include six audio commentaries, a behind-the-scenes featurette, and deleted scenes.

References

External links 
 
 

2015 American television seasons
Silicon Valley (TV series)